Royal Chapin Taft Sr. (February 14, 1823June 4, 1912) was a US politician and businessman, whose served as the 39th Governor of Rhode Island from 1888 to 1889. He was a member of the Taft political family; as a descendant of Robert Taft Sr., he was a distant cousin of President of the United States William Howard Taft.

Biography
Taft was born in Northbridge, Massachusetts, on February 14, 1823, and was educated at Worcester Academy. His parents were Orsmus Taft and Margaret (Smith) Taft; on October 31, 1850, he married Mary Frances Armington. They had four children.

He served as the treasurer of Central Congregational Church in Providence from 1855 to 1856.
He belonged to the Republican Party, and was an elected member of Rhode Island House of Representatives from 1880 to 1884 before his term as governor.

Taft was a member of the firm Bradford & Taft, wool dealers, from which he retired in 1885. He was also president of Merchants' National Bank from 1868 president of the Boston & Providence Railroad, and a director of the New York, New Haven and Hartford Railroad (which took control of the B&P in 1893).

In 1890 he became a charter member of the Rhode Island Society of the Sons of the American Revolution.  He served as the Society's president from 1897 to 1898.

He died June 4, 1912, at his home in Providence, Rhode Island. At the time of his death, he was the oldest living ex-governor of Rhode Island. He is interred at Swan Point Cemetery, Providence.

Legacy
He was a patron of the arts, with a large private collection; parts of his collection are now part of various institutions such as the Rhode Island School of Design.

Taft Hall at the University of Rhode Island is named after him, as well as the Royal C. Taft Outpatient Building (1891) at Rhode Island Hospital in Providence.

See also 

 List of presidents of the Rhode Island School of Design

References

External links 
 
 
 

1823 births
1912 deaths
American people of English descent
American people of Scotch-Irish descent
Republican Party governors of Rhode Island
Republican Party members of the Rhode Island House of Representatives
People from Northbridge, Massachusetts
Businesspeople from Massachusetts
Worcester Academy alumni
Taft family
Burials at Swan Point Cemetery
19th-century American politicians
19th-century American businesspeople